Marie Pujmanová  (née Hennerová; 8 June 1893, Prague – 19 May 1958, Prague) was a Czechoslovak poet and novelist.

She was a founding figure in Czechoslovak Socialist realism and has been referred to as a "tough-minded Stalinist". That stated, one of her own later works, had to be rewritten to be more firmly in line with the Party.

References 

Writers from Prague
Socialist realism writers
Czechoslovak poets
Czechoslovak novelists
Czechoslvoak surrealist writers
Czechoslvoak women writers
1893 births
1958 deaths